Víctor Rossi (La Paz, Canelones Department, 10 April 1943) is a Uruguayan politician.

A man of the Broad Front, he is serving his second office as Minister of Transportation and Public Works.

References 

1943 births
People from Canelones Department
Broad Front (Uruguay) politicians
Ministers of Transport and Public Works of Uruguay
Uruguayan people of Italian descent
Living people